Qin Yiyuan (born 14 February 1973) is a Chinese former world level badminton player. Qin played internationally for China from the mid-1990s through the 2000 Summer Olympics, a period during which her fellow countrywomen Ge Fei and Gu Jun dominated international women's doubles play. Qin won women's doubles at the 1996 China Open, 1997 Thailand Open, 1998 Denmark Open with Tang Yongshu, and at the 1999 Thailand, French, and Denmark Opens, and 2000 Swiss Open with Gao Ling. She was a bronze medalist at the 1995 IBF World Championships and a silver medalist at the 1997 IBF World Championships with Tang Yongshu. She earned a bronze medal again at the 1999 edition of the tourney with Gao Ling. Qin also earned bronze medals for women's doubles at the 1996 and 2000 Summer Olympics, the first with Tang Yongshu and the second with Gao. She was a member of Chinese teams which captured the Uber Cup (women's world team competition and trophy) in 1998 and 2000.

Achievements

Summer Olympics 
Women's doubles

World Championships 
Women's doubles

World Cup 
Women's doubles

Asian Games 
Women's doubles

Mixed doubles

Asian Championships 
Women's doubles

Asian Cup 
Women's doubles

East Asian Games 
Women's doubles

IBF World Grand Prix 
The World Badminton Grand Prix sanctioned by International Badminton Federation (IBF) since 1983.

Women's doubles

IBF International 
Women's doubles

Mixed doubles

References

External links
 
 
 
 
 
 

1973 births
Living people
People from Nanning
Badminton players from Guangxi
Chinese female badminton players
Badminton players at the 1996 Summer Olympics
Badminton players at the 2000 Summer Olympics
Olympic badminton players of China
Olympic bronze medalists for China
Olympic medalists in badminton
Medalists at the 1996 Summer Olympics
Medalists at the 2000 Summer Olympics
Badminton players at the 1998 Asian Games
Asian Games gold medalists for China
Asian Games bronze medalists for China
Asian Games medalists in badminton
Medalists at the 1998 Asian Games